Rosie O'Grady is a  1917 American silent drama film directed by John H. Collins and starring Viola Dana, Tom Blake and James Harris.

Cast
 Viola Dana as Rosie O'Grady
 Tom Blake as	Chimmie
 James Harris as Johnny Allen

References

Bibliography
 Slide, Anthony. The New Historical Dictionary of the American Film Industry. Routledge, 2014.

External links
 

1917 films
1917 drama films
1910s English-language films
American silent feature films
Silent American drama films
American black-and-white films
Films directed by John H. Collins
1910s American films
English-language drama films